Robert Emmett McGrath (June 13, 1932 – December 4, 2022) was an American actor, musician, and children's author best known for playing original human character and music teacher Bob Johnson on the long-running educational television series Sesame Street from 1969 to 2017.

Early life
McGrath was born on June 13, 1932, in Ottawa, Illinois, the son of Jeanne Biegge(née Hallagan) and Edmund Thomas McGrath, a farmer. He was named for the Irish patriot Robert Emmet. As a child he would sing for his family while his mother would play the piano. His mother enrolled him in the Roxy Theater's Amateur Program and he finished in second place. He graduated from Marquette High School. 

McGrath graduated from the University of Michigan in 1954; he went to the school of music there. While attending Michigan, he was a member of the University of Michigan Men's Glee Club and of the fraternity of Phi Gamma Delta. During fraternity events he washed dishes while David Connell, a fraternity brother, waited tables, a connection which Connell used when Sesame Street casting began. After graduating he was inducted into the U.S. Army; he was in Germany for two years performing for the Seventh Army Symphony Orchestra and booking for them.

McGrath earned a Master of Music degree in voice from the Manhattan School of Music in 1959.

Career
McGrath worked with Mitch Miller and was the featured tenor on Miller's NBC-TV television singalong series Sing Along with Mitch for four seasons from 1960 to 1964. He was a singer on the Walt Kelly album Songs of the Pogo.

In the mid-1960s, McGrath became a well-known recording artist in Japan, releasing a series of successful albums of Irish and other folk songs and ballads sung in Japanese. This aspect of his career was the basis of his "secret" when he appeared on the game shows To Tell the Truth in 1966 and I've Got a Secret in 1967. 

From 1969 to 2016, McGrath was a regular cast member on Sesame Street, playing the character of Bob Johnson. Along with series matriarch Susan Robinson, played by Loretta Long, McGrath was one of the two longest-lasting human characters on the series since the show's debut.  A Noggin segment proclaimed the four decades of Bob when promoting Sesame Street on that network. In July 2016, Sesame Workshop announced that McGrath would not return to the show for its 47th season because it would be re-tooling the series, but the company did say that McGrath would continue to represent the Workshop at public events. Sesame Workshop later announced that there would be talks to bring him back and that he would still represent Sesame Street. Although McGrath had not been in any new material since season 45, he subsequently appeared in online videos for the show. He also returned for the 2019 TV special Sesame Street's 50th Anniversary Celebration.

McGrath said that his two favorite moments on Sesame Street were Christmas Eve on Sesame Street (a 1978 Christmas special that included a pastiche of "The Gift of the Magi"), and the 1983 sequence that candidly addressed the death of longtime character Mr. Hooper, played by his good friend Will Lee who had died the previous year.

Other accomplishments
For 38 years, McGrath was a regular fixture on Telemiracle, a telethon broadcast annually on CTV outlets in the Canadian province of Saskatchewan. His final regular appearance at Telemiracle was in 2015, where performers at the show paid tribute to him. He returned for a special appearance in 2018. On March 3, 2006, he was awarded the Commemorative Medal for the Centennial of Saskatchewan for this work by the Lieutenant Governor of Saskatchewan, Lynda Haverstock. He was given the Saskatchewan Distinguished Service Award in 2013 by the Premier of Saskatchewan, Brad Wall.

He received a Distinguished Service Award for his decades of service by the Variety Children's Charity Telethon in British Columbia.

McGrath wrote many children's books, including Uh Oh! Gotta Go! (1996) and OOPS! Excuse Me Please! (1998).

In 1995, he was awarded a grant from the Foundation for Contemporary Arts Grants to Artists Award.

McGrath's Sing Me a Story was nominated for the 7th Annual Independent Music Awards for children's Album of the Year.

On April 10, 2010, he was the first recipient of the University of Michigan Men's Glee Club Lifetime Achievement Award.

Personal life and death
McGrath and his wife Ann married in 1958. They had five children, five granddaughters, and three grandsons. The couple lived in Teaneck, New Jersey, from 1958 until 2017, after which they moved to a ranch in Norwood, New Jersey. 

McGrath died from complications of a stroke at home on December 4, 2022, at age 90.

Filmography

References

External links

 
 
 
 
 NAMM (National Association of Music Merchants) Oral History Interview with Bob McGrath December 19, 2006

1932 births
2022 deaths
20th-century American male actors
21st-century American male actors
A&M Records artists
American children's musicians
American children's writers
American male television actors
American male voice actors
American tenors
Male actors from Illinois
Manhattan School of Music alumni
Military personnel from Illinois
Musicians from Illinois
People from Norwood, New Jersey
People from Ottawa, Illinois
People from Teaneck, New Jersey
University of Michigan School of Music, Theatre & Dance alumni
Writers from Illinois
Singers from New Jersey
Singers from Illinois